Alternate Learning (or ALRN) was a power pop/new wave band from 1977 to 1982, based in Davis, California and fronted by Scott Miller, a singer-songwriter later known for his work as leader of the 1980s band Game Theory and 1990s band the Loud Family.

Musical career

Early ALRN period (1977–1978)
Alternate Learning, which was Scott Miller's first band to record on independent recording label Rational Records, was initially formed while its original members were in high school. Miller, Jozef Becker, and Scott Gallawa began performing at Rio Americano High School under the name Alternate Learning as early as 1977.

The group's self-titled first release, a four-song 7" EP, was recorded by the three original members in Sacramento, in Miller's home recording studio. The EP was independently released on Rational Records in 1979.

The band and the Alternate Learning EP both became known by the abbreviation ALRN, which was prominently featured on the front cover of the debut release. Although the disc was labeled with the band's unabbreviated name, the release is most often known as the ALRN EP. The first EP is also sometimes referred to as the Green Card EP, based on the title of its first song.

Original Davis line-up (1978–1980)
 In 1978, Miller moved the band to Davis, California, where he was attending college.

Bass player Carolyn O'Rourke and keyboard player Lynn Ross joined the Davis-based band, which became regionally well known for their performances in the Sacramento area, in San Francisco, and most frequently at U.C. Davis.

In 1980, Lynn Ross, Scott Gallawa and Jozef Becker left the group, with Becker citing conflicts of personality. Gallawa and Becker formed the Les-Z-Boys with Guy Kyser; Becker and Kyser went on to become founding members of Thin White Rope. Becker, who was also a member of True West, rejoined Miller as a member of Game Theory from 1989 to 1990, and later was a member of Miller's 1990s group The Loud Family.

Painted Windows period (1981–1982)
In February 1981, drummer Eric Landers joined Alternate Learning, as did keyboard player Byl Miller (no relation to Scott Miller).

The 1981 lineup of Alternate Learning recorded a full-length LP called Painted Windows, which was released on Rational Records. During the recording of Painted Windows, Miller distanced the band from the previous ALRN release, writing in a newsletter that the 1979 EP "was not made by the present Alternate Learning, but by Scott Miller with Joe Becker and Scott Gallawa (now of Les-Z-Boys)."

After recording the album, and prior to its release, the Painted Windows line-up debuted in an appearance with Pylon in April 1981. They went on to perform a series of shows from April through October 1981. Although the album was released in January 1982, the band did not perform again until late February 1982.

All songs on Painted Windows were written and composed by Scott Miller.

Breakup (1982)
After the release of Painted Windows, the group's final show took place at the U.C. Davis Coffeehouse on Saturday, February 27, 1982. The trio of Scott Miller, Carolyn O'Rourke, and Byl Miller performed without a drummer, accompanied by taped percussion and effects, until they were joined onstage by drummer Gavin Blair of the X-Men for their concluding songs.

Alternate Learning was officially disbanded by Miller in May 1982. Within a few months, Miller had formed his new group, Game Theory. The new band included keyboard player and backing vocalist Nancy Becker, who had previously performed on synthesizer as a "sometime" member of Alternate Learning.

Collaboration with Steve Wynn 
In 1981, Alternate Learning members collaborated with Steve Wynn to form a trio called 15 Minutes, which released one single on Wynn's label, Down There Records.

15 Minutes consisted of Wynn on guitar and lead vocals, Caroline O'Rourke on bass, and Eric Landers on drums. Their single, "That's What You Always Say" b/w "Last Chance For You," was written and produced by Wynn, with Scott Miller engineering.  The A-side, "That's What You Always Say," was later recorded by The Dream Syndicate for their 1982 album The Days of Wine and Roses.

Both songs by 15 Minutes appear as bonus tracks on Rhino Records' 2001 remastered CD reissue of The Days of Wine and Roses.

Legacy

Material recorded by Game Theory
On Game Theory's double album Lolita Nation (1987), the track "Pretty Green Card Shark" includes the opening portion of "Green Card."
 
In 1990, former Alternate Learning members Scott Miller, Jozef Becker, and Nancy Becker returned to the studio, joined by Michael Quercio, to record a new version of the Alternate Learning song "Beach State Rocking."  Despite being a new recording by Game Theory, the 1990 remake of "Beach State Rocking" was the opening track on the chronologically-ordered Game Theory compilation CD Tinker to Evers to Chance, released on Enigma Records.

Memorial performance (2013) 
After Scott Miller's death, a memorial tribute concert was held in Sacramento on July 20, 2013, with proceeds directed to a memorial fund for the education of Miller's children. Nancy Becker performed alongside Fletcher Gallawa (son of original member Scott Gallawa) and his band, billed as "Nan Becker and the Wheels," to open the show with a set of Alternate Learning songs that included "Green Card," "What's the Matter," and "When She's Alone."

Tracks on Game Theory reissues (2014–2015) 
The 2014 reissue of Game Theory's Blaze of Glory included four bonus tracks from Alternate Learning: "What's the Matter" from the ALRN EP, and "Another Wasted Afternoon," "Beach State Rocking," and "The New You" from Painted Windows. The material on the expanded version of Blaze of Glory was remastered from the original tapes. Blaze of Glory was reissued by Omnivore Recordings in September 2014 on CD and vinyl, as the first of a series of remastered releases of the complete Game Theory catalog.

A live version of "Beach State Rocking" appears as a bonus track on Omnivore's March 2015 reissue of Game Theory's Real Nighttime.

Discography

Studio albums

Various artist compilations

Game Theory reissues (bonus tracks)

Collaborations

See also
 Scott Miller
 Scott Miller discography
 Game Theory
 The Loud Family

References

External links
 
 

Musical groups established in 1977
Musical groups disestablished in 1982
Musical groups from Davis, California
Alternative rock groups from California
American new wave musical groups
American power pop groups
1977 establishments in California
1982 disestablishments in California
Scott Miller (pop musician)